is a flight simulator video game for the Wii. The game was developed by CAProduction and published in Japan by Hudson Soft, Konami in North America, and in Europe and Australia by Nintendo.

Gameplay
It is played using the gesture system in the Wii Remote. The player tilts the remote horizontally to turn, vertically to go up or down, and flick the Wii controller two times to the side to do a barrel-roll. The aircraft is indestructible and even hard crash-landings will only cause a temporary loss of control.

In addition to flying a single plane, players are also able to fly a squadron of planes, which are controlled simultaneously, in many formations.

Challenges include balloon popping, fire fighting, and cargo delivery.

The game also includes multiplayer minigame elements.

Development
According to Hudson Soft, development on Wing Island was inspired by Nintendo's flight simulator Pilotwings, as the two share some distinct similarities.

Reception

The game has received very poor reviews, with most on-line and magazine based reviewers giving the game under half marks. The game sold only 800 copies on December 2, 2006, the day of the Wii launch in Japan.

References

External links
Official website 

2006 video games
CAProduction games
Flight simulation video games
Hudson Soft games
Nintendo games
Konami games
Wii-only games
Multiplayer and single-player video games
Video games about firefighting
Wii games
Video games developed in Japan